These are the official results of the athletics competition at the 2011 Pan Arab Games which took place on 15 – 20 December 2011 in Doha, Qatar.

Men's results

100 meters

Heats – 15 DecemberWind:Heat 1: +1.1 m/s, Heat 2: +1.8 m/s, Heat 3: 0.0 m/s

Final – 15 DecemberWind:+0.4 m/s

200 meters

Heats – 18 DecemberWind:Heat 1: +0.4 m/s, Heat 2: 0.0 m/s, Heat 3: 0.0 m/s

Final – 19 DecemberWind:+0.3 m/s

400 meters

Heats – 15 December

Final – 16 December

800 meters

Heats – 15 December

Final – 17 December

1500 meters

Heats – 19 December

Final – 20 December

5000 meters
20 December

10,000 meters
16 December

Half marathon
16 December

110 meters hurdles

Heats – 19 DecemberWind:Heat 1: +1.1 m/s, Heat 2: -0.4 m/s

Final – 20 DecemberWind:+0.4 m/s

400 meters hurdles

Heats – 16 December

Final – 17 December

3000 meters steeplechase
15 December

4 x 100 meters relay
20 December

4 x 400 meters relay
20 December

20 kilometers walk
15 December

High jump
16 December

Pole vault
17 December

Long jump
17 December

Triple jump
20 December

Shot put
19 December

Discus throw
17 December

Hammer throw
15 December

Javelin throw
16 December

Decathlon
December 19–20

Women's results

100 meters

Heats – 15 DecemberWind:Heat 1: +0.8 m/s, Heat 2: -1.0 m/s

Final – 15 DecemberWind:+0.3 m/s

200 meters

Heats – 18 DecemberWind:Heat 1: +0.1 m/s, Heat 2: 0.0 m/s

Final – 19 DecemberWind:+0.6 m/s

400 meters

Heats – 15 December

Final – 16 December

800 meters
19 December

1500 meters
15 December

5000 meters
19 December

10,000 meters
15 December

Half marathon
16 December

100 meters hurdles
15 DecemberWind: 0.0 m/s

400 meters hurdles
17 December

4 x 100 meters relay
20 December

4 x 400 meters relay
20 December

10,000 meters walk
15 December

High jump
17 December

Pole vault
20 December

Long jump
16 December

Triple jump
19 December

Shot put
16 December

Discus throw
19 December

Hammer throw
15 December

Javelin throw
19 December

Heptathlon
December 15–16

References

Results

Pan Arab Games
2011